Uğur Albayrak (born 8 June 1988) is a German footballer who plays for Turkish club TSKV Türkgücü Frankfurt 1983.

References

External links
 
 

1988 births
Living people
Footballers from Frankfurt
German footballers
German people of Turkish descent
Kayserispor footballers
FSV Frankfurt players
Eintracht Frankfurt II players
SV Darmstadt 98 players
Ottawa Fury FC players
Viktoria Aschaffenburg players
2. Bundesliga players
3. Liga players
Regionalliga players
North American Soccer League players
Expatriate soccer players in Canada
Association football forwards